Glasgow Botanic Gardens is a botanical garden located in the West End of Glasgow, Scotland. It features several glasshouses, the most notable of which is the Kibble Palace.

The Gardens has a wide variety of temperate and tropical flora, a herb garden, a chronological bed with plants arranged according to their introduction to Scotland, the UK's national collection of tree ferns, and a world rose garden officially opened in 2003 by Princess Tomohito of Mikasa.

The River Kelvin runs along the north side of the Gardens and continues through Kelvingrove Park, the Kelvin walkway providing an uninterrupted walking route between the two green spaces.

The Botanic Gardens was awarded a Green Flag Award in 2011.

History
In 1817 about 8 acres (32,000 m2) of land were laid out at Sandyford, near Sauchiehall Street, Glasgow, and run by the Royal Botanic Institution of Glasgow (founded by Thomas Hopkirk of Dalbeth and Prof James Jeffray Professor of Botany at Glasgow University), and were intended to supply the University of Glasgow. William Hooker was regius professor of botany at Glasgow University, and contributed to the development of the Botanic Gardens before his appointment to the directorship of Kew Gardens in London.  The Gardens moved to its current location in 1842. The gardens were originally used for concerts and other events, and in 1891 the gardens were incorporated into the Parks and Gardens of the City of Glasgow.

The site was once served by a railway line, and Botanic Gardens Railway Station remains today in a derelict state as a remarkable example of a disused station.  It is hidden behind some trees and a metal fence blocks access to the platforms. Kirklee railway station also lies just inside the gardens.

Kibble Palace

The Kibble Palace is a 19th-century wrought iron-framed glasshouse, covering 2137 m2. Originally designed for John Kibble by architects James Boucher and James Cousland for his home at Coulport on Loch Long in the 1860s, the components were cast by Walter Macfarlane at his Saracen Foundry in Possilpark. Eventually brought up the River Clyde by barge to the Botanic Gardens, it was fully erected at its current location in 1873 by Boyd of Paisley.

The building structure is of curved wrought iron and glass supported by cast-iron beams resting on ornate columns, surmounted on masonry foundations. It was initially used as an exhibition and concert venue, before being used for growing plants from the 1880s. Benjamin Disraeli and William Ewart Gladstone were both installed as rectors of the University of Glasgow in the palace, in 1873 and 1879 respectively – its last use as a public events venue, before becoming wholly used for the cultivation of temperate plants. The main plant group is the collection of New Zealand and Australian tree ferns, some of which have lived here for 120 years and which now form the national tree fern collection.

In the 1920s a statue was added in the palace to "King Robert of Sicily", a figure from the works of the American poet Henry Wadsworth Longfellow. This is by the Scottish sculptor George Henry Paulin.

In 2004 a £7 million restoration programme was initiated to repair corrosion of the ironwork. The restoration involved the complete dismantling of the palace, and the removal of the parts to Shepley Engineers in Shafton, South Yorkshire for specialised repair and conservation. The plant collection was removed completely for the first time ever, and the ironwork was rebuilt over a rearranged floorplan, giving the palace a prolonged life. It re-opened to the public in November 2006.

The building contains a large collection of orchids, carnivorous plants and tree ferns.

Sculptures in Kibble Palace
King Robert of Sicily (a hero created by Longfellow) by George Henry Paulin (1927)
Cain by Edwin Roscoe Mellins (1899)
Eve by Scipione Tadolini (c. 1870)
Ruth by Giovanni Ciniselli (1880)
The Sisters of Bethany by John Warrington Wood (about 1871)
The Elf by William Goscombe John (1899)
Stepping Stones by William Hamo Thornycroft (1878)
The Nubian Slave by Antonio Rossetti (c. 1880)

Library

The Gardens has a small but long-established research library. It contains over 2,300 items in its main books collection, a hundred items in special collections, a range of botanical periodicals, and a run of Curtis's Botanical Magazine (1787-present).

The library is not a public library but a reference collection for those working directly with the Gardens, and for botanical or horticultural students and researchers.

Gallery

References

External links
 
 Glasgow Botanic Gardens – Glasgow City Council
 Friends of the Glasgow Botanic Gardens
 Archive photographs of the Kibble's Restoration
 Photographs on Flickr
 Library catalogue

Botanical gardens in Scotland
Category A listed buildings in Glasgow
Gardens in Glasgow
Greenhouses in the United Kingdom
Inventory of Gardens and Designed Landscapes
1817 establishments in Scotland
1817 in science
Arboreta in Scotland
Rose gardens in Scotland
Science and technology in Glasgow
Hillhead